Zyllah Inez Shannon was an American actress who performed on stage and screen. In one of her theatrical roles she portrayed an intellectually advanced child.

Biography
Zyllah Inez Shannon was born in Missouri, to a family with six generations of history in theater. Her mother, Inez Shannon, was an actress and musician prominent in the 1910s.

Zyllah began appearing onstage at age two. Her best-known role was that of the young orphan Mary Margaret in Channing Pollock's play The Fool.

Theater
The White Cat (1905)
Confessions of a Wife (1907)
The Fool Has Said in His Heart - There is No God (1908)
The Family (1910)
Youth (1920)
 The Fool (1923)
The Front Page (1929)

Filmography
The Beloved Adventuress (1917), as Mrs. Nicholson
The Heart of a Girl (1918), as Mrs. Murphy
The Road to France (1918), as Mrs. O'Leary
The World to Live In (1919), as Ida
The Plunger (1920), as Mrs. Mullin
Cousin Kate (1921), as Mrs. Spencer
Two Shall Be Born (1924)

References

External links
 
 

1890s births
Year of death unknown
American silent film actresses
20th-century American actresses
American stage actresses
Actresses from Missouri